Peter Widén (born 2 July 1967 in Växjö) is a retired Swedish pole vaulter.

He set a national record of 5.75 metres at the 1991 World Championships in Tokyo. The record currently belongs to Armand Duplantis with 6.18 metres.

Achievements

References

1967 births
Living people
Swedish male pole vaulters
Athletes (track and field) at the 1992 Summer Olympics
Olympic athletes of Sweden
People from Växjö
Sportspeople from Kronoberg County